Waipukurau is the largest town in the Central Hawke's Bay District on the east coast of the North Island of New Zealand. It is located on the banks of the Tukituki River, 7 kilometres south of Waipawa and 50 kilometres southwest of Hastings.

History and culture

Māori
Central Hawkes Bay, where the town is located was settled by Te Aitanga a Whatonga, the descendants of Whatonga, grandson of Toi Kairakau. These were the Ngati Tara and Rangitāne peoples. In the mid 1500s the Ngāti Kahungunu invaded the area from the north and in the subsequent fighting drove the Rangitāne south into the Tahoraiti area (Dannevirke). Warfare continued through the 1600s until the time of Te Rangikoianake. His first child Te Kikiri was adopted by the Ngai Toroiwaho to be their chief - he had mana over the Waipukurau district.

Fighting broke out again in the 1800s at Mangatoetoe between Ngai Te Upokoiri and Ngāti Te Rangikoianake of Poukawa. Several of Te Rangikoianake's grand children were killed in this fight. Pareihe, a Ngati Rangikoianake Chief, avenged the defeat in a battle at Pukekaihau, Waipukurau after which a peace accord was made between the two tribes.

The accord was short lived with the death of Te Wanikau's brother-in-law (Chief of Ngai Te Upokoiri) prompting further conflict over the erection of rahui poles on Lake Poukawa, Ngati Rangikoianake's eel fishing area. The conflict, starting around 1819 and lasting till 1824 ended with the Ngati Rangikoianake and other local tribes evacuating the area and settling at Mahia. In the latter part of the 1820s Pareihe attacked the Ngai Te Upokoiri and regained the lands they had lost, with the Ngai Te Upokoiri taking refuge in the Manawatu. A peace accord was made between Pareihe and the Ngāti Tūwharetoa in the late 1830s. The Ngati Tuwharetoa had been allied with the Ngai Te Upokoiri.

Within the current township is Pukekaihau hill, now in Paul Hunter Memorial Park, the site of the Māori pa, from which it gets its name. Waipukurau is said to mean the water of pukerau, wai being water and pukerau being a type of fungus. The pa was near the old Māori trail from the Manawatu Gorge and Hawkes Bay. The first Europeans who are known to have passed through the area were Bishop George Selwyn and Chief Justice Sir William Martin in November 1842 en route to Napier.

European

In December 1850 Donald McLean and his party of Land Commissioners met with the Central Hawkes Bay tribes to discuss purchasing a large block of land for European settlement. Negotiations proceeded through till 4 November 1851 when an area of land called the Waipukurau Block, some 279,000 acres, including the land the town is situated on was acquired from local Maori, led by Te Hapuku for £4,800. Henry Russell acquired the land surrounding Waipukurau, calling it Mount Herbert station.

In 1857 there was an accommodation house run by a Mr Aveson. This was sold in October 1858 to George Lloyd and renamed Lloyds Hotel. The Hotel was transferred again in 1861 becoming Moss's Inn or the Tavistock Hotel. It was moved to its present site nearer the railway in 1916 and has been empty since 2013. A Town Hall was built nearby in 1877. It burnt down on 18 November 1922.

Horse racing started in 1859 with the first recorded meeting on 2 February. The provincial council approved construction of roading from Waipukurau to Porongahau, a goal, and the appointment of a Constable at Waipukurau in 1859. Roading to Forty-mile bush was not commenced until late 1867.

By at least 1858 Waipukurau was used as a hub for mail delivery to the district, a sale yard for stock, and a court venue.  In 1863 land was offered to the Agricultural Society for a show. By 1864 the Presbyterians were looking to set up a church in Waipukurau. There was a school in town by 1866 but this was closed when the building it used was destroyed by fire that year. The school was replaced in August 1867 by new building which was to serve as both a church and a school. The school had 9 pupils.

In 1867 Russell acquired the Pa Flat native reserve and founded Waipukurau on it as a model village. Russel chose the residents and approved the house plans.

Cobb and Co commenced the first coach service to the town in October 1867. A coach road to the south reached Norsewood in December 1873 and the Manawatu Gorge in February 1874. Tenders for a coach service from Waipukurau to Palmerston North were called for in March. The contract was awarded to Andrew Young, whose coach operated from Foxton. On his first journey from Foxton to Waipukurau his coach was intercepted by Alexander MacDonald as he was attempting to cross the Oroua River on former Ngāti Kauwhata land near Schultz's Hotel at Awahuri. MacDonald shot one of the lead horses preventing Young from continuing his journey. MacDonald was a staunch supporter of the Ngāti Kauwhata and had been seeking redress for the dispossession of the tribe from its land on 15 December 1866. MacDonald was imprisoned for three months because of this action, but his action did result in the tribe regaining some 6,200 acres of its land.

In October 1867 a dispute broke out between the residents of Waipukurau and the neighbouring township of Waipawa over the location of a telegraph station. The Provincial Council favoured Waipawa as the location. However, the Government's Telegraph Department preferred Waipukurau due its slightly more central location. The office was opened on 9 June 1868. Several weeks later on 22 June Frederick Christian Schäfer, passed through the town. Schäfer was a global traveller from Carlhafen in Hesse-Cassel who had walked through most of Europe, Palestine, two thirds of the way across the United States, Australia, Japan, China, Batavia, and Sumatra. He walked from Wellington to Waipukurau in 18 days.

One of the first sheep shearing competitions in New Zealand took place at Waipukurau in January 1868. Its purpose was to improve the quality of shearing, As a local response to Te Kooti's escape and conflict on the East Coast, a stockade was erected in late 1869, in what is now Hunter Memorial Park.

In November 1869 a Methodist Church was formed in the town. A boiling down works was constructed in March 1870, the same time a brewery was proposed and a flax mill opened.

Railway station 

Construction of a railway from Napier to Waipukurau commenced in 1872. The target was to complete the line by September 1873. This was not achieved and the extension to Waipukurau was opened just three days after Waipawa on 1 September 1876. A holiday was declared and two trains ran from Napier to celebrate the opening on Friday 8 September. The link to Palmerston North was not completed until 9 March 1891 due in part to the more difficult country and the impact of the Long Depression. The  extension to Waipukurau was built by the international contractor, Brogdens, for £9,469 7s 9d.

In 1874 Edmund G Allen won a £14,100 contract for the  extension south to Takapau. Waipukurau had been the terminus of the line for just over 6 months, when it opened on 12 March 1877. There were then two trains a day from Napier, one of which continued to Takapau.

In 1875 a station and stationmaster's house were built and a single track engine shed was added in 1877, just north of the station. Sixty years later the shed was leased to Belwood Bitumen Products Ltd. Railway houses were built in 1876, 1883, 1905, 1926 (5), 1931 (2), 1933 (2), 1955 and 1956. Refreshment rooms were built in 1887, or 1888. Trains were then allowed a stop of up to 10 minutes at the station. By 1896 Waipukurau had a 3rd class station, luggage room, platform, cart approach,   x  goods shed (moved from Pakipaki in 1875), loading bank, cattle yards, water, coal shed, turntable (extended in 1921 for the AB class, in 1934 that turntable went to Tāneatua and a  turntable came from Paekakariki in 1936. During the 1979 bridge works that turntable was sent to Masterton), engine shed, stationmaster's house, urinals and a passing loop for 49 wagons. In 1909 electric tablet signalling began between Lower Hutt and Waipukurau. On 24 March 1922 there was a refreshment room fire and the railways took over direct running of them from 1923. On 22 November 1929 the station safe was blown open. By that year, over 30 people were employed at the station, where they sold 20,816 tickets (4th busiest station on the line, after Napier, Hastings and Dannevirke) and handled 13,062 sheep and pigs.

In 1881 Wilding & Bull had a siding and built a large sawmill beside the station. Much of the timber came from Seventy Mile Bush. There were also sidings for a grain store, British Imperial Oil and Vacuum Oil Co.

On 7 October 2001 the station closed to passengers. The platform, station and passing loop remain.

Tukituki railway bridge 
Harry Monteith built a 22-span Waipukurau bridge. A footbridge was added in 1883 and it was repaired in 1897. It was replaced in 1978, at which time the stockyards were closed to improve the alignment of the track to the new bridge. About 13 February 2023 the small Harker Street bridge 176, just to the north of the main bridge 175, was washed away during Cyclone Gabrielle. Other parts of the town were also flooded.

Tarewa and Tapairu railway stations 
A mile to the north of Waipukurau, there was a flag station below Mount Vernon from 1877 to 1884. Its closure was announced several times, including in 1886, when the building was moved from Tarewa, to Tapairu, a mile south of Waipawa, which seems to have been open until 1889, or 1890. In 2009 the nearby SH2 road overbridge, which had replaced a level crossing in 1937, was replaced by a larger culvert to straighten the road.

Marae

The local Waipukurau Marae is affiliated with the Ngāti Kahungunu hapū of Ngāti Whatuiāpiti and Ngāti Tamatea.

Geography

Waipukurau had a population of 4,386 at the 2018 New Zealand census, an increase of 498 people (12.8%) since the 2013 census, and an increase of 225 people (5.4%) since the 2006 census. There were 1,755 households, comprising 2,082 males and 2,304 females, giving a sex ratio of 0.9 males per female, with 837 people (19.1%) aged under 15 years, 684 (15.6%) aged 15 to 29, 1,746 (39.8%) aged 30 to 64, and 1,113 (25.4%) aged 65 or older.

Ethnicities were 79.0% European/Pākehā, 29.9% Māori, 3.1% Pacific peoples, 3.4% Asian, and 1.2% other ethnicities. People may identify with more than one ethnicity.

The percentage of people born overseas was 10.7, compared with 27.1% nationally.

Although some people chose not to answer the census's question about religious affiliation, 48.7% had no religion, 37.7% were Christian, 3.4% had Māori religious beliefs, 0.3% were Hindu, 0.2% were Muslim, 0.2% were Buddhist and 1.4% had other religions.

Of those at least 15 years old, 315 (8.9%) people had a bachelor's or higher degree, and 975 (27.5%) people had no formal qualifications. 261 people (7.4%) earned over $70,000 compared to 17.2% nationally. The employment status of those at least 15 was that 1,590 (44.8%) people were employed full-time, 477 (13.4%) were part-time, and 138 (3.9%) were unemployed.

In December 1858 Waipukurau census area had 243 males and 73 females - a total population of 316. 1,441 acres of land were fenced or cultivated with 95 horses, 364 cattle, and 20,365 sheep. There were also 4 goats and 61 pigs.

The 40th parallel south passes through Waipukurau township.

Climate

Education

Waipukurau has three long-running primary schools, with relatively stable roll numbers:
 Waipukurau School is a Year 1-8 co-educational state primary school.
 The Terrace School is a Year 1-8 co-educational state primary school.
 St Joseph's School is a Year 1–8 co-educational state integrated Catholic primary school.

Central Hawke's Bay College is a Year 9-13 co-educational state secondary school.

Waipukurau also has branches of five youth organisations: Scouts New Zealand, GirlGuiding New Zealand, New Zealand Cadet Forces, St John Youth and Epic Ministries. Each organisation ranges from 20 to 100 members.

Hospital
In 1876 the Government donated 5 acres of land for a Hospital which was to be half paid for by the local community. It was completed in 1879 and consisted of two wings – the male and female wards, as well as four other rooms to house staff. It also had a dispensary, committee room, dining room, and kitchen. The hospital was the Waipawa County Hospital until 1907. In 1909 a further ward built. In 1919, as a result of the influenza pandemic, an infectious disease annex. This building became the geriatric unit in 1962. A nurses’ home was built in 1926 and extended in 1942.

An administration block was erected in 1927, with the former administration area became a children's ward. In 1935 further alterations were carried out which added a medical administration and outpatients’ wing and an operating theatre . From 1942 to 1964 two new wards, clinics for x-ray and physiotherapy, a laboratory, an administration block, a mortuary, and an operating theatre were added. Finally in 1966 additions were made to the maternity annexe. The hospital was closed in 1999.

Employment 
The town is a farming based community and provides dairy, fruit, vegetable and meat exports. Most employment is seasonal related, dependent on surrounding local agricultural and horticultural industries.

Through the 1940s-1970s one of the town's main businesses was Denne Bros/Peter Pan Frozen Foods, well known throughout the country for their ice cream brand. The two factories were considered local landmarks. The company was the main employer of Waipukurau, as well the nearby township Waipawa in the 1950s and 1960s.

Notable residents 
 Johannes "Joh" Bjelke-Petersen,  (1911–2005), Premier of Queensland 1968–1987, lived in Waipukurau as a very young child
 Hinewehi Mohi, musician and television producer
 Errol Brathwaite - author
 Matt Berquist - professional rugby player
 John Atcherly Cardinal Dew, Roman Catholic Archbishop of Wellington (2005–present) 
 Campbell Johnstone - professional rugby player
 Andrew Williams - former North Shore mayor

References

External links 

Map of Waipukurau
Central Hawkes Bay District Council
1966 New Zealand Encyclopedia Page
Central Hawkes Bay Tourism Site
Photo of railway bridge about 1920

Central Hawke's Bay District
Populated places in the Hawke's Bay Region